RAM Racing was a Formula One racing team which competed during the racing seasons of 1976 to 1985. The team entered other manufacturers' chassis from 1976 to 1980, then ran March's team from 1981 to 1983, only entering a car entirely their own in 1984 and 1985.

The team was formed in 1975 by Mike Ralph and John Macdonald, with RAM derived from their names. After running Macdonald in a GRD in British Formula Three, they entered Alan Jones in a Formula 5000 March for 1976. They also bought a pair of Brabham BT44B Formula One cars, and entered the 1976 World Championship, running Loris Kessel and Emilio de Villota for the Spanish Grand Prix, where neither qualified. However, both Kessel and another pay-driver, Patrick Nève, qualified for the Belgian Grand Prix, with Jac Nellemann, Damien Magee, Lella Lombardi and Bob Evans all making appearances in the cars. There were few finishes, and the pay-drivers meant the team were frequent non-qualifiers.

For 1977, Boy Hayje drove a RAM-entered March with little success, and a second "rent-a-car" did no better later in the year when driven by Andy Sutcliffe, Mikko Kozarowitzky or Michael Bleekemolen. However, they had some success running Guy Edwards in the Shellsport Group 8 Championship in Britain, finishing 2nd overall. For 1978 the team switched to the British Aurora Formula One series, with Edwards placing 4th overall that year in a March, and 5th overall the following season in a Fittipaldi F5A. For 1980, RAM made an investment in a pair of 1979-spec Williams FW07s, with Emilio de Villota winning the title. Sponsorship included American men's magazine Penthouse. They then entered one of these cars for Rupert Keegan in the British Grand Prix. Kevin Cogan and Geoff Lees would guest in another car in the last two rounds, but their best finish was Keegan's 9th place at the United States Grand Prix.

1981 saw RAM manage and run the returning March Grand Prix team, with Derek Daly and Eliseo Salazar driving. However, non-qualifications were frequent, and the team failed to score any points, Daly's 7th place at the British Grand Prix being their best result.

The combination stayed together for 1982, landing backing from Rothmans, and the new March 821 saw design work from a young Adrian Reynard. With veteran Jochen Mass to lead the team, backed up by Raul Boesel, hopes were high, but it was another disappointing year. Mass took 7th place at the Detroit Grand Prix, but as the car proved to be slow he lost motivation, and focused more on sports car racing with Porsche. From the German Grand Prix, Keegan took over the car, but RAM March once again failed to score points.

1983 saw the RAM name make itself onto the chassis for the first time, with Dave Kelly's RAM March 01 design. Salazar returned to drive the main entry, while a second car for Jean-Louis Schlesser was fielded at the French Grand Prix as a one-off. Salazar scored a 15th place in the season opener, but the bulky car struggled to qualify. Financial reasons saw the team skip the Detroit Grand Prix, while they only made the Canadian Grand Prix due to fielding local driver Jacques Villeneuve, Sr. and attracting some Canadian sponsorship. Kenny Acheson then took over for the rest of the season, only qualifying once, at the season-closing South African Grand Prix, where he took the team's best result of the year, 12th and last.

Astonishingly, the team pressed on into 1984. The partnership with March was dissolved, and RAM attracted sponsorship from Skoal Bandit. Two RAM 02 cars, with Hart turbo engines, were entered for Formula Two champion Jonathan Palmer and Philippe Alliot. Kelly's new design was disappointing, and the cars were frequent back-markers, and Palmer's 8th place in the opening Brazilian Grand Prix was their best result of the year (and of all time). Indeed, the team drew more notices for the crashes their drivers were involved in.

Alliot remained for 1985, with Manfred Winkelhock entered in the second car, and a new RAM 03 designed by Gustav Brunner. Winkelhock put in some improved qualifying performances, but actual results were still thin. Winkelhock's death in a sports car event in Canada in the summer was a blow to the team, and Acheson was recalled briefly, before the team slimmed down to a single entry. They missed the final two rounds altogether. Skoal withdrew their backing at the end of the year, the team's best result having been Alliot's 9th place, again at the opening Brazilian Grand Prix.

The team planned to enter a single updated RAM 03 for Mike Thackwell (who had stood in for Palmer at the 1984 Canadian Grand Prix) for the  season, but the funds could not be found, and the team folded over the winter of 1985. The team would have raced as car #9 for 1986 otherwise, per the FIA entry list.

Complete Formula One results

Notes
 – Not entered as a Constructor.

References

Formula One constructors
Formula One entrants
British auto racing teams
British racecar constructors
International Formula 3000 teams
Auto racing teams established in 1975
Auto racing teams disestablished in 1985